Southern Connector may refer to:

 
 Southern Connector Toll Road, an approximately 10 mile toll portion of Interstate 185 in South Carolina

See also 
 Northern Connector